The Hauraki Fault is a normal fault along the eastern side of the still tectonically active Hauraki Rift which could have a length up to  and fairly likely . The recently identified but yet to be fully characterised 25km long Te Puninga fault is presumably an intra-rift fault which augments the active displacement of the rift accommodated by the active intra-rift Kerepehi Fault. However shallow small earthquakes have been mapped to the presumed location of the Hauraki Fault.

Geology
The fault is inferred from the sharp transition to the east from the Firth of Thames and Hauraki Plains to the Coromandel and Kaimai Ranges with hot spring activity along this line.

References

Seismic faults of New Zealand
Thames-Coromandel District
Firth of Thames
Hauraki District